Mercy Wesutila (born 8 March 1976) is a Kenyan female volleyball player. She was part of the Kenya women's national volleyball team.

Life
She competed with the national team at the 2004 Summer Olympics. She participated in the 2002 FIVB Volleyball Women's World Championship. She played with Kenya Pipelines in 2004.

Clubs
  Kenya Pipelines (2004)

References

External links
 
 
 
 
 
 

1976 births
Living people
Kenyan women's volleyball players
Place of birth missing (living people)
Volleyball players at the 2004 Summer Olympics
Olympic volleyball players of Kenya